Khaled El Amin (born 6 October 1976), known as Khaled Bebo, is an Egyptian former football striker.

Bebo is mostly famous for scoring 4 goals in Cairo Derby against Zamalek in a game ended 6–1 on 16 May 2002. It is Zamalek's biggest derby loss since the commencement of the Egyptian league fixture in 1948. It is the first and only time in the history of the fixture that any player had achieved this feat.

He also scored 3 goals in the CAF Champions League 2001 2nd leg final against Mamelodi Sundowns in a game ended 3–0. Helping Al Ahly to win the competition.

International goals

Scores and results list Egypt's goal tally first:

References

External links
 
 

1976 births
Living people
Egyptian footballers
Egypt international footballers
Association football forwards
Al Ahly SC players
1999 FIFA Confederations Cup players
2002 African Cup of Nations players
People from Suez
Egyptian Premier League players
Petrojet SC players
Suez SC players
Al Masry SC
Ismaily SC players